Andrea Michaels (born 24 May 1975) is an Australian politician representing the South Australian House of Assembly seat of Enfield for the South Australian Branch of the Australian Labor Party since the 2019 Enfield by-election.

Michaels has served as the Minister for Small and Family Business, the Minister for Consumer and Business Affairs and the Minister for Arts in the Malinauskas ministry since March 2022. She previously shadowed these roles while in opposition from August 2020.

References

Living people
Members of the South Australian House of Assembly
21st-century Australian politicians
Women members of the South Australian House of Assembly
Australian Labor Party members of the Parliament of South Australia
Australian women lawyers
21st-century Australian lawyers
Lawyers from Adelaide
Flinders University alumni
Australian people of Greek Cypriot descent
21st-century women lawyers
1975 births
21st-century Australian women politicians